, also known as , is an airport located on the island of Izu Ōshima, Tokyo, Japan .

History
Ōshima Airport was built in June 1964, with a  runway. The runway was lengthened to its present  length in October 2002 to permit operations by jet-powered aircraft. From August 2008, All Nippon Airways (ANA) began daily services to Haneda Airport in Tokyo. New Central Airservice began operations to Chofu Airport from 2009. ANA ended service to Oshima in October 2015.
Since 9 July 2021, Oshima Airport has been called  as nickname.

Airlines and destinations

Prior to 2015, ANA Wings operated a daily service to Haneda Airport.

Facilities
Oshima Airport is operated by the Tokyo Metropolitan Government. The terminal is open from 8:30 a.m. to 4:30 p.m. daily and contains a restaurant, shop and observation deck. The Japan Civil Aviation Bureau and Japan Meteorological Agency maintain offices on-site.

Bus service
Ōshima Airport Terminal Bus stop

Kuko kitaguchi Bus stop
It is located north of Airport Terminal, it takes 5 minutes from this airport on foot.

References

External links
 Tokyo Oshima Camellia Airport
 Oshima Airport Branch - Tokyo District Meteorological Observatory
 ANA Airlines airport guide

Airports in Tokyo
Transport in the Greater Tokyo Area
Japan Self-Defense Forces